Zeltnera beyrichii, commonly known as mountain pink, quinine weed or rock centaury, is an annual plant in the New World that blooms from late spring to early fall. Used as a medicinal plant by pioneers, the flowers were dried and used to reduce fevers.

Until 2004 it was known as Centaurium beyrichii.

References

External links 
Photo gallery

beyrichii